Dmitri Ustritski (born 8 May 1975 in Tallinn) is a former Estonian professional footballer. He was playing the position of striker. He spent the prime years of his career playing for JK Viljandi Tulevik. He won a total of 17 international caps for the Estonia national football team.

International career

International goals
Scores and results list Estonia's goal tally first.

References

External links
 

Estonian footballers
Estonia international footballers
Viljandi JK Tulevik players
Estonian people of Russian descent
FC Valga players
Footballers from Tallinn
1975 births
Living people
Association football forwards